Helen McFie (married name Simone; born 1945) is a retired rower who competed for Great Britain.

Rowing career
McFie grew up in Kenya to Scottish parents and started rowing when she attended Darwin College, Cambridge, to study for a master's degree. In 1971 and 1972 she rowed for Cambridge at The Boat Race. She was part of the eight at the 1975 World Rowing Championships in Nottingham, the crew finished 10th overall after a fourth-place finish in the B final.

References

1945 births
Living people
British female rowers
Alumni of Darwin College, Cambridge